Carl Koenig was a member of the Wisconsin State Assembly.

Biography
A German emigrant, Koenig was born on March 10, 1864. He would become a Lutheran church elder.

Assembly career
Koenig was elected to the Assembly in 1920, 1924 and 1926. He was a Republican.

References

Republican Party members of the Wisconsin State Assembly
20th-century Lutherans
1864 births
Year of death missing
Leaders of the American Society of Equity